Lidar mostly refers to the sensor system Lidar. It may also refer to:

Biology

 Lidar (lacewing) - a pleasing lacewing genus in the family Dilaridae

Name

 Israeli surname Lidar as in case of Daniel Lidar
 Norwegian given name Lidar

Fiction

 Lidar is a character from Tomes & Talismans